GeoAPI is free software providing a set of Java interfaces for GIS applications. GeoAPI interfaces are derived from the abstract model and concrete specifications published collaboratively by the International Organization for Standardization (ISO) in its 19100 series of documents and the Open Geospatial Consortium (OGC) in its abstract and implementation specifications. GeoAPI provides an interpretation and adaptation of these standards to match the constraints and usages of the target programming language.
The international standards translated to Java interfaces are:

 ISO/TS 19103:2005 — Conceptual schema language
 ISO 19115:2003 — Metadata
 ISO 19115-2:2009 — Metadata — Part 2: Extensions for imagery and gridded data
 ISO 19111:2007 — Spatial referencing by coordinates

GeoAPI 3.0 has been approved as an OGC standard and is published as an OGC implementation specification. The Java Archive Files are available from the Apache Maven central repository.

See also
 Open Geospatial Consortium – a standards organization

References

External links
 GeoAPI home page

Open Geospatial Consortium
Java platform software
Free software
Cross-platform software